Omnicide – Creation Unleashed is the fourth studio album by German melodic death metal band Neaera. It was released on 26 May 2009 through Metal Blade Records. The album was recorded at the Rape of Harmonies Studio with producer Alexander Dietz. The artwork was created by Terje Johnsen.

The album entered the German Media Control chart at No. 51.

Track listing

Personnel 
Writing, performance and production credits are adapted from the album liner notes.

Neaera
 Benjamin Hilleke – vocals
 Stefan Keller – guitar
 Tobias Buck – guitar
 Benjamin Donath – bass
 Sebastian Heldt – drums

Production
 Alexander Dietz (Heaven Shall Burn) – recording, production
 Ralf Müller – recording, production
 Patrick W. Engel – recording, production
 Zeuss – mixing, mastering

Artwork and design
  – artwork

Chart performance

References

External links 
 
 Omnicide – Creation Unleashed at Metal Blade Records
 Omnicide – Creation Unleashed at Neaera's official website

2009 albums
Metal Blade Records albums
Neaera (band) albums